Donald O'Connor (born 1958, Gilgandra, New South Wales) is an Australian cricketer who played first class cricket for Tasmania and South Australia. He was a talented left-handed batsman, who played interstate cricket from 1981 until 1990.

O'Connor was raised on a farm outside Gilgandra. He was educated at Gilgandra's St Joseph's Catholic Primary School by the Sisters of St Joseph (the 'black Joeys'). From 1971 to 1974 he attended Gilgandra High School. His cricketing talent showed early during his school years and in high school he was selected in regional representative schoolboy teams.

See also
 List of Tasmanian representative cricketers

References

External links

1958 births
Living people
Tasmania cricketers
Australian cricketers
South Australia cricketers
People from the Central West (New South Wales)
Cricketers from New South Wales